Russell Williams (born 20 January 1974) is a former Australian rules footballer who played with Essendon in the Australian Football League (AFL).

Williams, an Indigenous Australian from South Fremantle, played his football as a rover. He made three appearances for reigning premiers Essendon in the 1994 AFL season and then returned to Western Australia, having been unable to settle in Melbourne.

References

External links
 
 

1974 births
Australian rules footballers from Western Australia
Indigenous Australian players of Australian rules football
Essendon Football Club players
South Fremantle Football Club players
Living people